Michael Coetzee (born 9 September 1949) is a South African cricketer. He played in seven first-class matches for Border from 1968/69 to 1972/73.

See also
 List of Border representative cricketers

References

External links
 

1949 births
Living people
South African cricketers
Border cricketers
People from Luanshya